Samuda Brothers was an engineering and ship building firm at Cubitt Town on the Isle of Dogs in London, founded by Jacob and Joseph d'Aguilar Samuda. The site is now occupied by Samuda Estate.

Samuda Brothers initially leased a premises on the Goodluck Hope peninsula, Leamouth, London in 1843, by the mouth of Bow Creek. However disaster struck with one of their first ships, the Gipsy Queen which exploded on its test trip in November 1844. Jacob was killed with nine of the firm's employees. There was a further explosion at their shipyard in 1845 and another three workers were killed.

The firm moved to Cubitt Town in 1852, having outgrown a site that was hemmed in by other industrial premises. By this time the company was run by Joseph, Jacob having been killed in the trial of the Gipsy Queen. The Cubitt Town yard specialised in iron and steel warships and steam packets and by 1863 was said to be producing double the output of the other London shipyards combined. 

Samuda fabricated components for the Waterloo and Whitehall Railway, an atmospheric railway system. The project was abandoned due to the 1866 financial crisis. Orders from Germany, Russia and Japan enabled the firm to survive the crisis, which affected many other London yards.

  
In 1877 Togo Heihachiro, later a prominent Japanese admiral, came for work experience with the Samuda Brothers after completing his training at Naval Preparatory School in Portsmouth, and the Royal Naval College at Greenwich. He supervised the construction of the Fusō before returning to Japan. He led the Imperial Japanese navy to victory in the Russo-Japanese War, establishing Japan as a Great Power.

Following the death of Joseph in 1885 attempts were made to sell the firm as a going concern. This was unsuccessful, resulting in closure in the 1890s, leaving Yarrows and Thames Ironworks as the last significant London shipbuilders.

Ships built by the Samuda Brothers
 SS Carnatic, P&O, 1862
 HMS Tamar, Royal Navy, 1863
 BAP Independencia , Peruvian Navy, 1864
 Mahroussa, Khedive of Egypt, 1865
 Bordein, Khedive of Egypt, Nile steamer c 1865
 SMS Kronprinz, Prussian Navy, 1867
 Muin-i Zafer, Ottoman Navy, 1869
 SMS Deutschland, German Navy 1875
 Fusō , Imperial Japanese Navy, 1877
 HMS Belleisle, Royal Navy 1876 (originally to be Peyk-i Şeref for Ottoman Empire)
 HMS Orion, Royal Navy 1879 (originally to be Büruç-u Zafer for Turkish Navy)
 ARA Almirante Brown, Argentine Navy, 1880
 Riachuelo, Brazilian Navy, 1883
 HMS Sappho, Royal Navy, 1891
 PS Myleta (1891), a paddle steamer with a two cylinder single oscillating engine. Built for the South Eastern Railway, and scrapped in 1909

See also
 South Devon Railway engine houses

References

Defunct shipbuilding companies of the United Kingdom
Shipbuilding in London
Ships built in Leamouth
Ships built in Poplar
Ships built in Cubitt Town
Port of London
Shipyards on the River Thames
British marine engineers